The 2018–19 Biathlon World Cup – Stage 4 was the fourth event of the season and was held in Oberhof, Germany, from 10–13 January 2019.

Schedule of events 
The events took place at the following times.

Medal winners

Men

Women

References 

2018–19 Biathlon World Cup
2019 in German sport
Biathlon World Cup - Stage 4
Biathlon competitions in Germany
Sport in Oberhof, Germany
2010s in Thuringia